William Richard Herrion (born April 6, 1958) is an American college basketball coach.  Since 2005, he has been the men's head coach with the University of New Hampshire.  Prior to coming to UNH, he served as the head coach at East Carolina University and Drexel University.  He has been an assistant with Boston University, George Washington University, and the U.S. National Team.

Personal life
Herrion is a 1981 graduate of Merrimack College.

Herrion's son Ryan played for him at UNH from 2008 through 2012, and was director of operations and video coordinator for the Wildcats from 2013 to 2015.

Herrion's brother Tom formerly served in the NCAA's Division I as the head men's basketball coach at the College of Charleston and an assistant coach at the University of Pittsburgh.  Tom is the former head men's basketball coach at Marshall University.

Coaching career
Herrion began his college coaching career in 1985 as an assistant under Mike Jarvis at Boston University.  He followed Jarvis to George Washington University before striking out on his own as a head coach. In April 1991, Herrion was hired to coach Drexel after Dayton assistant Tom McConnell turned down the job. Herrion later coached at East Carolina and UNH.

He is one of the most successful men's coaches in the history of the America East Conference.  The Drexel Dragons won 3 conference championships in a row under Herrion's leadership from 1994 to 1996. In 1998, on the occasion of the conference's 20th anniversary, he was named one of the four most influential coaches in the conference's history: the other three coaches were Jarvis, Rick Pitino and Hall of Famer Jim Calhoun.  He holds the conference record for most playoff wins (18 with Drexel, 1 with UNH, for a total of 19.)

On December 4, 2010, he won his 300th game when UNH beat Colgate, 65–60, and earned his 400th career win on January 10, 2018 in a 71–67 win over Binghamton.

Head coaching record

References

External links

New Hampshire bio
East Carolina bio
Drexel Dragons bio

1958 births
Living people
American men's basketball coaches
American men's basketball players
Arkansas Razorbacks men's basketball coaches
Basketball coaches from Massachusetts
Basketball players from Massachusetts
Boston University Terriers men's basketball coaches
College men's basketball head coaches in the United States
Drexel Dragons men's basketball coaches
East Carolina Pirates men's basketball coaches
George Washington Colonials men's basketball coaches
Merrimack Warriors men's basketball players
New Hampshire Wildcats men's basketball coaches
People from Oxford, Massachusetts
Place of birth missing (living people)
Sportspeople from Worcester County, Massachusetts